Capparimyia is a genus of tephritid  or fruit flies in the family Tephritidae.

Species
 Capparimyia melanaspis

References

Dacinae
Tephritidae genera